Balldren is a village and a former municipality in the Lezhë County, northwestern Albania. At the 2015 local government reform it became a subdivision of the municipality Lezhë. The population at the 2011 census was 6,142.

Etymology
The name comes from the Albanian, which means "in front of the Drin". In Latin and later Italian sources, the town was known by the names Blandin or Baladreni.

References

Former municipalities in Lezhë County
Administrative units of Lezhë
Villages in Lezhë County